Henry C. King (9 March 1915 - 30 July 2005) was a British astronomer and writer.

He was born in London, but the family later moved to Marlow, Buckinghamshire where Henry attended the Sir William Borlase School. For his thirteenth birthday, his father gave him a copy of The Story of The Heavens by Robert S Ball. Another move took the family to Slough in the late 1930s. Here Henry contacted Lady Constance Lubbock, William Herschel's grand-daughter, and was able to access the Herschel Library.

He obtained a B.Sc. in astronomy and mathematics by correspondence, from the University of London, and subsequently, an MSc and Ph.D on the history and philosophy of science.

During World War II he was Inspector of Aeronautical Instruments for the Ministry of Aircraft Production at Ruislip. In the 1950s he was Senior Lecturer in Ophthalmic Optics at Northampton College of Advanced Technology, (now City, University of London). In 1956, he became the first Scientific Director of the London Planetarium. Ten years later, he became Director of the McLaughlin Planetarium, Toronto. He was President of the British Astronomical Association from 1958-60.

Family

He married Mary Wilson in 1939. They had two children, David and Margaret.

Publications

 The History of the Telescope, 1955
 The Background of Astronomy, 1956
 Exploration of the Universe: From the Astrolabe to the Radio Telescope, 1964
 Dr H C King's Book of Astronomy, Collins, 1966.

With John R. Millburn

 Geared to the Stars: The Evolution of Planetariums, Orreries and Astronomical Clocks, 1978
 Wheelwright of the Heavens: The Life and Work of James Ferguson, FRS, 1988

References

 Cooper, Heather, "Seeing Silver Stars", New Scientist, 17 March 1983, p 750 Photograph of Henry C. King at the London Planetarium.
 King, David A, "Henry C. King (1915 - 2005)", Journal for the History of Astronomy, Vol. 38, Part 4, No. 133, p. 526 - 527 (2007)
 Mobberley, Martin, It Came From Outer Space Wearing an RAF Blazer!: A Fan's Biography of Sir Patrick Moore, Springer International Publishing, 2013.

External links
 Geared to the Stars: The Evolution of Planetariums, Orreries and Astronomical Clocks at the Internet Archive. Image of cover.
 Books by Henry Charles King in the British Library catalogue. Does not include those listed under Henry C. King.

20th-century British astronomers
1915 births
2005 deaths
Historians of science
Civil servants in the Ministry of Aircraft Production